The United Nations Educational, Scientific and Cultural Organization (UNESCO) has designated 147 World Heritage Sites in Africa. These sites are located in 46 countries (also called "state parties").

Selection of World Heritage Sites 
South Africa has the lead with ten sites; followed by Ethiopia and Morocco being home to nine sites; then Tunisia with eight sites; and Algeria, Egypt, Senegal, and Tanzania at seven. Nine countries have only a single site each. Four sites are shared between two countries: Maloti-Drakensberg Park (Lesotho and South Africa), the Mount Nimba Strict Nature Reserve (Côte d'Ivoire and Guinea), the Stone Circles of Senegambia (the Gambia and Senegal), and Mosi-oa-Tunya / Victoria Falls (Zambia and Zimbabwe). Two sites are shared among three countries: Sangha Trinational (Central African Republic, Cameroon, and Congo) and W-Arly-Penjari Complex (Benin, Burkina Faso, and Niger).

The first sites from the continent were inscribed in 1978, when the Island of Gorée of Senegal and the Rock-Hewn Churches and Simien National Park of Ethiopia were chosen during the list's conception.

As of September 2017, Somalia has no official World Heritage Sites since the Somali government is not party to the 1972 World Heritage Convention. However, there are -- at the very least -- around a dozen archaeological sites in the country that are believed to be potential future candidates for World Heritage status.

Each year, UNESCO's World Heritage Committee may inscribe new sites on the list or delist sites that no longer meet the criteria. Selection is based on ten criteria: six for cultural heritage (i–vi) and four for natural heritage (vii–x). Some sites, designated "mixed sites", represent both cultural and natural heritage. In Africa, there are 91 cultural, 50 natural, and 6 mixed sites.

Several efforts have been devoted to increasing the number of sites and preserving the heritage of existing sites on the continent; for example, on 5 May 2006, the African World Heritage Fund was launched by UNESCO to target the region of Sub-Saharan Africa. It planned to protect the sites by hiring personnel for state parties to maintain national inventories of existing sites, as well as to "prepare nomination dossiers for inscription onto the World Heritage List". Grants were also destined to help the "[conservation] and management of heritage properties in general" and to rehabilitate properties in danger.

The drive was initially funded by South Africa with US$3.5 million, and, as of March 2011, has amassed $4.7 million from various countries, with an additional $4.1 million in pending pledges. UNESCO has also attempted to increase awareness of African human origin sites in Ethiopia, with a goal of conserving and protecting the areas from further deterioration.

The World Heritage Committee may also specify that a site is endangered, citing "conditions which threaten the very characteristics for which a property was inscribed on the World Heritage List". Along with other World Heritage Sites, sites in danger are subject to re-evaluation by the committee every year at their "ordinary sessions". Africa has 21 sites on the danger list, accounting for 14% of all African sites and 40% of the 52 endangered sites worldwide.  Libya has 5 sites on the danger list, the second-highest of any country in the world.

Sites in Africa have been marked as such for a variety of reasons, such as deforestation and hunting, civil war, threats to and hostage taking of reserve staff, oil and gas projects and mining, declines in biodiversity, and structural damage to buildings. Ten sites were formerly declared as being in danger, but have since lost the status; examples include the Ngorongoro Conservation Area (1984–1989), the Rwenzori Mountains National Park (1999–2004), and Tipasa (2002–2006). Garamba National Park and Timbuktu have also lost their statuses in 1992 and 2005, respectively, but later regained it in 1996 and 2012. Despite its large number of endangered sites and the circumstances surrounding them, African World Heritage Sites have never been stripped of their title, something that has only occurred three times.

World Heritage Sites

Legend 
The list below ignores UNESCO's geopolitical definition of Africa and includes what it describes as sites in the "Arab States". Egypt is included as part of North Africa. The list also comprises a number of sites for which the state party is outside the continent, but the site itself is located in Africa; four such sites are located on the Canary Islands (belonging to Spain), one on Madeira (belonging to Portugal), one on Réunion (belonging to France), and one on the Tristan da Cunha archipelago (belonging to the United Kingdom).

Site – named after the World Heritage Committee's official designation
Location – sorted by country, followed by the region at the regional or provincial level. In the case of multinational or multi-regional sites, the names are sorted alphabetically.
Criteria – as defined by the World Heritage Committee
Area – in hectares and acres, excluding any buffer zones. A value of "—" implies that no data has been published by UNESCO
Year – during which the site was inscribed to the World Heritage List
Description – brief information about the site, including reasons for qualifying as an endangered site, if applicable

Sites 
'''

Performance of Africa in UNESCO 
The countries are divided according to their regions: blue for Northern Africa, orange for Eastern Africa, purple for Central Africa, green for Western Africa, and red for Southern Africa. (Note: this chart does not include the sites located in Africa that belong to European countries.)

See also 

 Lists of World Heritage Sites

Notes

References

External links 

 agoras.typepad.fr/regard_eloigne/dominique-sewane/
 www.sciencespo.fr/psia/users/dominiquesewane
 http://www.unesco.org/fr/university-twinning-and-networking/access-by-region/africa/togo/unesco-chair-in-influence-of-african-thought-preservation-of-african-cultural-heritage-718/

Africa
 
World Heritage Sites